Events from the year 1658 in art.

Events
 (unknown)

Paintings

Guido Cagnacci – Death of Cleopatra
Pieter de Hooch
The Courtyard of a House in Delft (National Gallery, London)
Woman Drinking with Soldiers (The Louvre)
A Woman drinking with Two Men, and a Maidservant (National Gallery, London)
Elisabetta Sirani – Baptism of Christ
Rembrandt – Self-portrait
Simon Ushakov
Great Hierarch
Saviour Acheiropoieta (date doubtful)
Wallerant Vaillant – Trompe-l'œil letter rack
Adriaen van der Spelt and Frans van Mieris – Flower Piece with Curtain (The Art Institute of Chicago)
Jan Vermeer
The Little Street
The Milkmaid

Births
January 9 - Nicolas Coustou, French sculptor (died 1733)
March 23 - Jean-Baptiste Santerre, French painter (died 1717)
June 11 - Victor Honoré Janssens, Flemish painter (died 1736)
July 14 - Camillo Rusconi, Italian sculptor (died 1728)
August 25 – Claude Audran III, French painter (died 1734) 
date unknown
Christian Berentz, German artist (died 1722) 
Carlo Antonio Bussi, Swiss painter (died 1690)
Antonio Calza, Italian painter of historical and battle-scenes (died 1725)
Giovanni Agostino Cassana, Italian painter of animals and subject pictures (died 1720)
Lars Gallenius, Finnish painter (died 1753)
Ogata Kōrin, Japanese painter and lacquerer (died 1716)
Franz Werner von Tamm, German-born, Italian painter (died 1724)

Deaths
June 11 - Domenico Carpinoni, Italian painter of primarily religious works (born 1566)
June 27 - Ercole Gennari, Italian Renaissance drawer and painter (born 1597)
June 29 - Gerrit Reynst, Dutch merchant and art collector (born 1599; drowned)
November - Pieter de Bloot, Dutch painter (born 1601)
December 2 - Cornelis Holsteyn, Dutch painter of historical allegories, portraits, and interior decorations (born 1618)
date unknown
Clemente Bocciardo, Italian painter (born 1620)
Francis Cleyn, German painter and tapestry designer (born 1582)
Carlo Ridolfi, Italian art biographer and painter (born 1594)
Pieter Anthonisz. van Groenewegen, Dutch painter and member of the Bentvueghels (born 1590-1600)
Cristóbal Vela, Spanish Baroque painter and gilder (born 1588)
Robert Walker, English portrait painter (born 1599)
Xiang Shengmo, Chinese painter of the Qing Dynasty (born 1597)
probable - Giulio Quaglio the Elder, Italian painter of frescoes (born 1610)

References

 
Art
Years of the 17th century in art
1650s in art